John Claypole (21 August 1625 – 26 June 1688) was an officer in the Parliamentary army in 1645 during the English Civil War. He was created Lord Claypole by Oliver Cromwell, but this title naturally came to an end with the Restoration of 1660.

Claypole married Elizabeth, Oliver Cromwell's second daughter, before October 1646, and raised a troop of horse for Parliament to oppose Charles II in 1651. He was master of the horse to his father-in-law the Lord Protector. A Member of Parliament in 1654 and 1656, he was one of Cromwell's peers in 1657. After the restoration of the monarchy he lived quietly, but may have been briefly imprisoned as a suspect in a plot in 1678, only to be released when no evidence of his involvement was presented.

Background 
Claypole was descended of a gentle family. seated at Narborough, in the county of Northampton (now known as Northborough, Cambridgeshire), upon the borders of Lincolnshire, possessing considerable estates in both those counties.

Claypole was the son of John Claypole the Elder and his wife Mary/Marie, née Angell, and the grandson of Adam Claypole. In 1637 John Claypole, senior was summoned before the Star Chamber, and the attorney-general was ordered to commence a prosecution against him for refusing to pay ship money; it cannot therefore be wondered at, that he declared for the Parliament at the start of the English Civil War in 1643, and 1644, he was appointed one "of their assessors for the county of Northampton; but at this time he was so little known,' that his name is spelt a great variety of ways,

John Claypole snr was, probably, sheriff for his own county, as major-general William Boteler recommends him to John Thurloe, in a letter to him, dated 16 November; he was a member of Parliament in 1654 for the county of Northamptonshire; he was alive so late as 1657, when he was made a commissioner with his son, for levying the taxes upon the county of Northampton; and to distinguish them, he is called "John Claypole, esq. senior", and his son "lord Claypole".

Mark Noble speculates that the sentiments the father entertained respecting the state of the nation was probably the same as that which Oliver Cromwell possessed, when he first gained a seat the Long Parliament; and as John Claypole had suffered hardships during King Charles I's Eleven Years' Tyranny, it might occasion an intimacy that ended in an alliance between the families. John Claypole (junior) married Elizabeth, the second, and favorite, daughter of Oliver Cromwell, some time before October 1646.

Civil War and Protectorate 
John Claypole jnr first appeared in arms for parliamentary cause in the First English Civil War at the siege of Newark in the winter of 1645–46. On 11 August 1651, during the Third Civil War, he received a commission from the council of State to raise a troop of horse in the counties of Northamptonshire and Lincolnshire to oppose the march of Charles II into England.

When his father-in-law, Oliver Cromwell, was invested with the title of Protector, he received from him the office of master of the horse; and, as such, led the horse of state at the inauguration, going bare-headed on one side of the protector's body coach, with Walter Strickland, captain of the guard to the Lord Protector, he acted in the same capacity at the second, or more magnificent investment, when he stood immediately behind the protector during that ceremony.

He was a member of First Protectorate Parliament, in 1654, for Carmarthenshire.  On 15 January 1656 he was appointed a member of the committee of trade. He was elected MP for Northamptonshire and for Carmarthenshire in the Second Protectorate Parliament in 1656 and chose to sit for Northamptonshire. in parliament, he opposed the power of the major-generals. Ludlow said:

Claypole was appointed by his father-in-law one of the lords of his bed-chamber, clerk of the hanaper, and ranger of Whittlewood Forest in Northamptonshire, where he built Wakefield Lodge, a magnificent house near Potterspury. (It came into the possession the Dukes of Grafton, the first duke having had a grant of the forest in 1685, with the title of hereditary ranger.) To raise him still further above the rank of a private gentleman, Cromwell granted Claypole a baronet on 16 July 1657, and arranged to have him knighted at Whitehall the same day. Later that year Claypole was made one of the Protectors lords, and given a seat in the Protector's Upper House.

Oliver Cromwell directed Claypole to receive the Dutch ambassadors upon their return to London, in March, 1654; and he used Claypole as his to go-between when asking for advise from William Lilly the astrologer. During the short reign of his brother-in-law Richard Cromwell, Claypole retained all his places at court, and carried the sword of state when Richard opened his Parliament.

In his religious sentiments Claypole was a Presbyterian, and in that communion died; however, he was not puritanical in his demeanour. Mrs. Hutchinson terms him "a debauched ungodly cavalier", and in the Second Narrative of the late Parliament he is described as one "whose qualifications not answering to those honest principles formerly so pretended of putting none but godly men into places of trust, was for a long time kept out". Samuel Pepys mentions a famous running footman who had been in Claypole's service, and Clapole also asked Colonel Verney for a dog of superior fighting capacity. Claypole had a taste for mathematics, and probably for architecture, and was the intimate friend of Christopher Wren.

During the restoration 
Mark Noble suggests that Claypole had a mild and gentle disposition that rendered him unfit for any services for the Protectors, but such as were of a peaceable kind, and which they were lavish in giving to him, both as the husband of Oliver's favourite child, and as a most amiable person Oliver employed. Instead therefore, of appointing Claypole to be a major-general, where severity and rigour was necessary, Oliver gave him places of great honour and emolument, but of such a nature as that the most scrupulous might accept. As Claypole had never, during the whole time of his relations holding the helm, done any action that could even inconvenience an individual, at the restoration of the monarchy he was included in the general pardon, unlike those who had participated in acts such as the regicide of Charles I who were exempted from the general pardon and were tried for crimes committed during the Interregnum. Until her death in 1665 Claypole gave shelter to Elizabeth Cromwell, his mother-in-law and Oliver Cromwell's widow. Some years afterwards, however, when court and country were filled with rumours of plots, Claypole was fixed upon to be the head and contriver of one against the royal family, supposedly in consort with the old Oliverian party.

Mark Noble states that he was apprehended, in June, 1678, and sent to the Tower, obtaining an habeas corpus to the king's bench, he thought to procure bail but though many persons, to whom no objection could be made, offered themselves for that purpose, chief-justice Sir William Scroggs set the bail so high that Claypole's friends thought it prudent to decline it. Claypole was therefore remanded back to the Tower; but at the next term, as no evidence appeared against him, and what was, perhaps, much more fortunate to him, a counter plot began to work, he was discharged. When writing the Dictionary of National Biography article on Claypole, Charles Harding Firth concurs with Noble, but Ivan Roots in the more recent Oxford Dictionary of National Biography does not, and thinks it is a case of mistaken identity because although a man called John Claypole, whose profession is given as a printer, was held on suspension of being involved in a plot given his character, it was unlikely to be John Claypole who resided at the manor of Northborough.

History is silent what became of him after his imprisonment.  Probably he returned to his estate in Northamptonshire (where he had resided when he was taken into custody).

Family 
Elizabeth and John Claypole had a daughter and two sons Henry and Oliver. Oliver died just before his mother, and Mark Noble speculates that the grief for the loss may well have hastened her death in 1658. His children with Elizabeth all predeceased him. Claypole married a second time, in June 1670, Blanche, widow of Lancelot Stavely, by whom he had one daughter, Bridget. However, Claypole fell under the influence of Anne Ottee, a laundress, and disinherited Bridget for Ottee's benefit. Bridget brought an action in chancery and recovered some portion of his property, but most of it, including the manor of Northborough, Claypole had sold off during his lifetime.

Claypole had several other relations including a brother called Henry In Thurloe's state papers, notice is taken of captain Wingfield Claypole, an officer in Ireland, and Christopher Claypole, who Mark Noble believed was also, in the army, and was sent to the Hague in 1658. John Claypole expresses his obligations to Henry Cromwell, lord-deputy (in a letter dated 16 April 1658) for his regard to his brothers and sisters, and himself, upon all occasions; he tells him, "that indeed, they cannot plead any desert, though," says he, "my sister is very good, yet not enough so to entitle her to so much of your kindness". This sister seems to be the wife of major Staples, who certainly married one of his sisters, and as he earnestly requests a place for him of the lord-deputy, it is most reasonable to suppose he was the husband of this sister in whose praise he speaks. Wingfield, and another of his brothers, had done something wrong, for he says of the former, "I wish he had not presumed upon your goodness, in to long an absence", and requests his pardon on his behalf, yet desires he may be reprehended; and also requests that his other brother may likewise be reproved, as he fears he will stand in too much need of it. Another brother was James Claypoole, 1634–1687, an admired friend of William Penn, the Quaker, who emigrated to Philadelphia, Pennsylvania in 1683. Other brothers included Edward (1636 – ca. 1690), a Captain of Foot, who resided in Barbados from the late 1660s/early1670s and Norton (1640–1688), who emigrated to North America in 1678 and died there in Sussex County, Delaware.

Notes

Citations

References
 Sources:
The life of John Claypole, son-in-law of the protector Oliver, is taken from Vertue's engravings of Simons's works;
Rushworth's collections;
ordinances and journals of the house of commons;
lives of the protector Oliver;
Ludlow's memoirs;
Wood's fasti;
Mr. Pennant's tour from Chester to London;
perfect politician, or life of O. Cromwell;
Thurloe's state papers;
Lilly's life of himself;
history of the civil wars of Great-Britain, containing an exact history of the occasion, original, progress, and happy end of the civil war, by an impartial pen, London, 1661;
secret history of Europe;
history of England, during the reigns of the Stuarts;
Toland's life of Harrington, prefixed to his Oceana;
biographia briannica, under the article doctor Wren, bishop of Ely.

</ref>

Attribution:
 Endnotes:
Though Heath. A Brief Chronicle of all the Chief Actions so fatally Falling out in the three Kingdoms., first published in 1662.
Noble's House of Cromwell, ii. 370–87;
Ludlow's Memoirs, ed. 1751 ;
Carlyle's Cromwell's Letters and Speeches;
Burton's Cromwellian Diary ;
Domestic State Papers ;
Mercurius Politicus.

Further reading
 Decedents of Richard Cleypole

Roundheads
1625 births
1688 deaths
English Presbyterians of the Interregnum (England)
Members of the Parliament of England (pre-1707) for constituencies in Wales
English MPs 1654–1655
English MPs 1656–1658
Prisoners in the Tower of London
Members of Cromwell's Other House